Hasharabad (also Romanized as Ḩasharābād) is a village in Khatunabad Rural District, in the Central District of Jiroft County, Kerman Province, Iran. At the 2006 census, its population was 602, in 100 families.

References 

Populated places in Jiroft County